Impossible is a 2015 Chinese science fiction comedy film directed by Sun Zhou. It was released on December 4, 2015 in 2D and 3D.

Plot
Memeda, a "human detector" from outer space happens to meet a depressed man who just lost his daughter in a car accident. After delving into Liguo's heart, Memeda decides to follow this poor man and studies him inside out, however, it eventually gets itself into the complicated "human world". As a powerful careerist, Wu yiran shows no mercy to anyone: he successfully squeezes Liguo and his partner Ruoshui's company out of business, nevertheless, he wants to use Memeda's superpower and makes him the emperor of mankind!......

Cast
Wang Baoqiang
Xiaoshenyang
Da Peng
Yin Zheng
Cheng Yi
Xin Zhilei

Music 
The original score was composed by Deddy Tzur and Daniel Alcheh, and features soloists recorded in Los Angeles and orchestras recorded in Europe. The score was mixed by Elliot Hunt in 5.1 surround at alcheh&hunt studios in Boulder, CO and mastered by Dominic Maita in Boulder, CO. Additional mixing was done by Michael Seifert for Comba-Music for Yuli Studio in Beijing.

Theme Song: We Go On 
The theme song "We Go On," co-written by composer Daniel Alcheh and lyricist Jamie Kiffel-Alcheh, was produced by Elliot Hunt and mastered by Dominic Maita. It is an orchestral power-ballad featured in the climax of the film, with instrumental versions throughout the film. The track is sung by American pop singer Grey, who became known after her appearance on NBC's The Voice, where she landed a spot on Adam Levine's team.

International Film Releasing 
The movie was only released in all south east asian countries such as: Cambodia (hang meas), Brunei (Regalblue Production), Malaysia (Astro Shaw), and Samoa (southseas Pictures.)

Reception
The film grossed  on its opening weekend in China.

References

External links

2015 3D films
Chinese 3D films
Chinese science fiction comedy films
2010s science fiction comedy films
2015 comedy films